General elections were held in Southern Rhodesia on 14 April 1939, the fifth elections since the colony of Southern Rhodesia was granted internal self-government. Prime Minister Godfrey Huggins' United Party government were re-elected in a landslide. The elections were called slightly earlier than the deadline as Huggins feared the German invasion of Czechoslovakia would lead to European War.

Electoral system
In 1937, a new Electoral Act was passed. The franchise was extended slightly to those who were not British subjects but who had been in active wartime service in the armed forces. Electors were also required to have lived for three months in their electoral districts. The requirement for qualifying for the vote on the basis of receiving salary or wages of £100 per annum was extended also to people with income of £100 per annum, a change which principally benefited those who had investment income but few assets. Voters were also no longer required to demonstrate proficiency in English through a dictation test. The postal vote, which had been introduced in 1928, was extended in 1937 to all voters living more than 25 miles away from the nearest polling station. Finally, those who had drawn government rations were disenfranchised.

A boundary revision in 1938 enabled the elimination of the four remaining double-member electoral districts as the Colony was split into 30 single-member districts.

Results

By constituency

Byelections

Salisbury Gardens
Sir Percival Fynn died on 25 April 1940. Owing to the war, normal party politics had been suspended and a joint selection conference including members of both the United Party and the Rhodesia Labour Party was included. Four candidates stood for the selection: Cecil Douglas Dryden (United Party), Mrs. Gladys Maasdorp (Rhodesia Labour Party), Arthur William Redfern (Independent) and O.P. Wheeler (Independent). Redfern was selected and returned unopposed on 26 June 1940.

Umtali North
Edgar Whitehead resigned from the Assembly on 24 June 1940. A byelection was held to replace him on 27 August 1940.

Hartley
Hugh Volant Wheeler resigned on 30 June 1940. A byelection was held in his constituency on 27 August 1940.

Lomagundi
Lewis Aloys MacDonald Hastings resigned on 30 June 1940. A byelection was held in his constituency on 27 August 1940.

Victoria
William Alexander Eustace Winterton resigned on 30 October 1940. A byelection was held on 10 December 1940.

Insiza
Robert Clarkson Tredgold resigned on 28 February 1943. A byelection was held on 21 April 1943 to replace him.

References

Sources
 Source Book of Parliamentary Elections and Referenda in Southern Rhodesia 1898–1962 ed. by F.M.G. Willson (Department of Government, University College of Rhodesia and Nyasaland, Salisbury 1963)
 Holders of Administrative and Ministerial Office 1894–1964 by F.M.G. Willson and G.C. Passmore, assisted by Margaret T. Mitchell (Source Book No. 3, Department of Government, University College of Rhodesia and Nyasaland, Salisbury 1966)

Elections in Southern Rhodesia
Southern Rhodesia
1939 in Southern Rhodesia
Southern Rhodesia
Election and referendum articles with incomplete results